

Excavations
 Aëtos Hill, Menelaion Ridge, Laconia, Greece, takes place under H. W. Catling.
 San Vincenzo al Volturno by the British School of Archaeology at Rome begin (continue to 1986).
 Ain Dara temple, Syria; continues until 1985.
 Excavations begin at Dryslwyn Castle in Wales under the direction of Chris Caple; the dig lasts until 1995 and the results written up in a monograph published by the Society for Medieval Archaeology in 2007

Finds
 17 February - Derrynaflan Chalice in the south of Ireland.
 28 March - Talpiot Tomb in Jerusalem.
 August - Wreck of the Breadalbane in the Northwest Passage.
 Wreck of the paddle steamer Eric Nordevall in Vättern in Sweden.
 Wreck of American Great Lakes whaleback barge 115 in Lake Superior.
 Frieze at Aphrodisias in Anatolia showing Claudius subjugating Britannia.

Publications
 W. A. McCutcheon - The Industrial Archaeology of Northern Ireland. Belfast: HMSO. .

Events
19 December - Chaco Canyon National Monument is renamed Chaco Culture National Historical Park with 13,000 acres (53 km2) added. The Chaco Culture Archaeological Protection Site program is created to protect Chacoan sites.

Births

Deaths
 January 2 - Rhys Carpenter, American Classical art historian (b. 1889)
 August 24 - André Parrot, French archaeologist of the Near East (b. 1901)
 September 8
 Willard Libby, American physical chemist, key developer of radiocarbon dating (b. 1908)
 Keith Muckelroy, British maritime archaeologist, in diving accident (b. 1951)
 November 16 - Don Crabtree, American experimental archaeologist (b. 1912)

See also
 Pompeii

References

Archaeology
Archaeology by year
Archaeology